Glafira Vladimirovna Deomidova (b. 1929) is a Russian soprano who sang at the Bolshoi Theatre company from 1956 to 1977.

Deomidova sang the role of Bianca in Zdeněk Chalabala's premiere (and only) recording of Shebalin's Taming of the Shrew in 1957 and the female lead role of Olga in the first (and likewise only) recording of Prokofiev's The Story of a Real Man conducted by Mark Ermler in 1961.

References

1929 births
Living people
Russian operatic sopranos
Soviet sopranos
Soviet women opera singers